Pierre Paiement (born September 13, 1950) is a Canadian former professional ice hockey player who played in the World Hockey Association (WHA). Paiement played part of the 1972–73 WHA season with the Philadelphia Blazers.

Career statistics

References

External links

1950 births
Canadian ice hockey right wingers
Living people
Philadelphia Blazers players
Roanoke Valley Rebels (EHL) players
Roanoke Valley Rebels (SHL) players
Ice hockey people from Montreal